Duncan Drummond Cameron is a British microbiologist and Professor of Plant and Soil Biology at the University of Sheffield. His research considers multiomics approaches to understand the interactions between soil microbes and plant nutrition. Alongside his research, Cameron works in science policy, and was involved with the 2015 United Nations Climate Change Conference.

Early life and education 
Cameron started his academic career at the University of Sheffield, where he studied animal and plant biology. He was a doctoral student at the University of Aberdeen, where he researched the effect of Rhinanthus minor on the structure of the environments it inhabits. Over the course of one growing season, he found that Rhinanthus minor suppresses the growth of grasses and legumes whilst promoting the growth of forbs. Cameron returned to the University of Sheffield as a postdoctoral researcher, before being appointed a Royal Society University Research Fellowship. He worked as a research fellow at the University of Würzburg.

Research and career 
Cameron started his independent academic career at the University of Sheffield, investigating agricultural practise and the movement of nutrients in symbiotic organisms. His research efforts look to inform sustainable approaches to feed growing populations. He makes use of both molecular biology and biochemistry to understand the communication of microbes, and how they exchange resources in symbioses. He leads the UK Research and Innovation H3 (healthy soil, healthy food, healthy people) consortium, a scheme which looks to transform the UK food system.

In 2013 Cameron was Chair of the Royal Society Frontiers of Science meeting. He was the University of California, Riverside Invited Lecturer in 2021. Alongside his research, Cameron is involved with the science communication master's programme at the University of Sheffield.

Select publications 

 
 
 

Cameron writes for the website The Conversation.

Personal life 
Cameron is gay, and works to improve the visibility of LGBT people at the University of Sheffield.

References 

British microbiologists
Academics of the University of Sheffield
Alumni of the University of Sheffield
Alumni of the University of Aberdeen
Royal Society University Research Fellows
Year of birth missing (living people)
Living people